is a Tongan rugby union player who plays as a wing for Leicester Tigers in England's Premiership Rugby.

Early life
Saumaki began playing rugby at the age of 15.

Professional career
Saumaki played for Daito Bunka University at university level in Japan.

While still at university, he was included in Japan's 43-man squad in May 2016 for their June tests, but due to complications with previously representing Tonga at Sevens, was unable to gain clearance from World Rugby to represent the Brave Blossoms.

Saumaki joined Top League outfit Canon Eagles in 2017 after graduating from Daito Bunka University. He made his Top League debut in the opening game of the 2017-18 season against Suntory Sungoliath . He finished the season on 10 tries in 13 appearances (10 starts), with only Panasonic Wild Knights winger Akihito Yamada (12) crossing the whitewash more often in the 2017-18 Top League.

On 30 July 2021 Saumaki moved to England to join Leicester Tigers.  He made his Leicester debut on 2 October 2021 in a Premiership Rugby game against Saracens; and on 20 November 2021 he scored a hat-trick against Wasps in the Premiership Rugby Cup, despite only scoring his first try in the 68th minute.

On 15 January 2022 Saumaki scored the winning try as Leicester beat Connacht to seal their place in the Champions Cup round of 16.  After the match he revealed that he had still not been able to contact family in Tonga after the volcanic eruption and tsunami of that morning.

References

External links

Tongan rugby union players
1992 births
Living people
Rugby union wings
Yokohama Canon Eagles players
Tongan expatriates in Japan
Sunwolves players
Leicester Tigers players